The 2021 REV Group Grand Prix at Road America was the ninth race of the 2021 IndyCar Series season. The race was held on Sunday, June 20, 2021, in Elkhart Lake, Wisconsin at Road America, a  permanent road course. The race took the scheduled 55 laps to complete. At race's end, Álex Palou, driving for Chip Ganassi Racing, would take advantage of a disaster-striken Josef Newgarden to win his second career IndyCar Series win and his second of the season. To fill out the podium, Colton Herta, driving for Andretti Autosport with Curb-Agajanian, and Will Power, driving for Team Penske, would finish second and third, respectively.

Background 
Road America is a motorsport road course located near Elkhart Lake, Wisconsin on Wisconsin Highway 67. It has hosted races since the 1950s and currently hosts races in the NASCAR Xfinity Series, NTT Indycar Series, NTTWeatherTech SportsCar Championship, SCCA Pirelli World Challenge, ASRA, AMA Superbike series, IndyCar Series, and SCCA Pro Racing's Trans-Am Series.

Numerous driver replacements would occur for the race. Former F1 driver Kevin Magnussen, would who make his IndyCar debut, would replace Felix Rosenqvist, who suffered injuries at the 2021 Chevrolet Detroit Grand Prix. Oliver Askew would also replace an injured Rinus VeeKay, who suffered injuries in a cycling incident.

In addition, NASCAR driver Cody Ware would make his IndyCar debut.

Entry list

Practice

First practice 
The first practice session was held on Friday, June 18, at 5:00 PM EST. The session would last for 45 minutes. Romain Grosjean, driving for Dale Coyne Racing with Rick Ware Racing, would set the fastest time in the session, setting a time of 1:47.6781.

Second practice 
The second practice session was held on Saturday, June 19, at 11:10 AM EST. The session would last for 45 minutes. Josef Newgarden, driving for Team Penske, would set the fastest time in the session, setting a time of 1:45.3399.

Third and final practice 
The final practice session was held on Saturday, June 19, at 5:30 PM EST. The session would last for 30 minutes. Colton Herta, driving for Andretti Autosport with Curb-Agajanian,  would set the fastest time in the session, setting a time of 1:47.6312.

Qualifying 
Qualifying was held on Saturday, June 19, at 2:30 PM EST. The qualifying format was a three-round knockout elimination format. For round one, the field is divided into two groups based on the odd and even positions of drivers in the final pre-qualifying practice session. The fastest driver in that session decides which group the odd-positioned drivers will be in with the even-positioned drivers in the other group. The fastest six drivers from each group would move onto round 2. Then, the fastest six drivers in round 2 would move onto to the third round, also known as the Firestone Fast Six. The fastest driver in Round 3 would win the pole.

Josef Newgarden, driving for Team Penske would win the pole after advancing from both preliminary rounds and setting the fastest lap in Round 3, setting a time of 1:46.0186 in the third round.

Full qualifying results

Race results

Standings after the race 

Drivers' Championship standings

Engine manufacturer standings

Note: Only the top five positions are included.

References 

2021 in IndyCar
June 2021 sports events in the United States